Okky Puspa Madasari is an Indonesian novelist, essayist, and academic known for her portrayals of the social and political conditions in Indonesia. Okky largely focuses her writing on resistance against injustice and the struggle for freedom and humanity.

Early years

Okky was born on October 30, 1984, in Magetan, East Java, Indonesia. She graduated from Gadjah Mada University’s International Relations Department in 2005, with a bachelor's degree in political science. After her graduation, she pursued a career as a journalist and writer. In 2012, she began a master's program in sociology from the University of Indonesia. She graduated in July 2014, with a thesis titled Genealogi Novel Indonesia: Kapitalisme, Islam dan Sastra Perlawanan (Genealogy of Indonesian Novels: Capitalism, Islam and Critical Literature).

In August 2019, Okky began work on her PhD thesis on cultural censorship in Indonesia's post totalitarian era. She is writing the thesis under a full scholarship from the National University of Singapore.

Novels

Okky's novels consistently attempt to raise issues around human rights and freedom, describing struggles against any form of repression. Okky is seen as a realist. All of her novels attempt to portray Indonesia and its people, along with basic and universal problems that face humankind.
 
Her novels have won praise across Indoensia. Apsanti Djokosujatno, one of Indonesia's prominent literary critics from the University of Indonesia, claimed that they are already categorized as canon and will be considered classics. She goes further to dub her as the next Pramoedya Ananta Toer.

Okky's first novel, Entrok (2010), tells a story about how Indonesians live under the ruthless dictatorship of Suharto's regime and how they struggled to survive under oppression of the military's dominance. Her second novel 86 (2011) vividly describes the prevalent corruption within the country and especially among its civil servants The novel was shortlisted as top five in the Khatulistiwa Literary Award in 2011. Her third novel Maryam (2012) describes how Ahmadis are violently thrown away from their own homeland by the government. It won the 2012 Khatulistiwa Literary Award. It was also translated into English under the title of The Outcast, and it's been available in bookstores since March 2014.

Okky also won an Indonesian major literary prize, the Khatulistiwa Literary Award, in 2012 for her third novel, Maryam. At the age of 28, she is the youngest ever to win the award. Her novels were shortlisted three years in a row by the award's judges.

Pasung Jiwa is her fourth novel, and was released in May 2013. It addresses an individual's struggle to break free from their personal limitations as well as societal restrictions like norms, traditions, religion, government, and economic dominance from the rich. The novel was shortlisted by the Khatulistiwa Literary Award in 2013. Pasung Jiwa was also translated into English under the title Bound in July 2014 and translated into German under the title Gebunden. Five years later, it was translated into Arabic and published in Egypt.

Her fifth novel, Kerumunan Terakhir, was published in May 2016. In this novel, Okky tries to capture how digital phenomena and social media take over people's lives, with the new generation confusing reality with the virtual world.
The novel was translated into English under the title The Last Crowd.

Short stories
In 2017, she published her first anthology of short stories titled Yang Bertahan dan Binasa Perlahan (Resisting and Fading Away), which covered various issues influential to Indonesia, and summarized her short story writing from the past decade. Short stories in the collection follow themes related to the human struggle to cope with the limitations and conflicts present in daily life. It also covers themes like the personal and private life of an individual, conflict in families, political corruption, and religious hypocrisy in Indonesia.

Children's novels
Inspired by her daughter's nightly before-sleep request for story telling, she embarked on writing novels for children in early 2018, and finished her first children's novel, Mata di Tanah Melus (Mata in the Land of Melus) in the middle of the same year. The novel tells a story about adventure of 12-year-old Matara and her mother in a fantasy world in Belu, East Nusa Tenggara. The novel becomes the first of children adventure series, called Mata Series, and has been well received either by the public and literary critics, with one analyst praising it as a progressive work important to Indonesia's children literature.

Encouraged by the good reception, Okky quickly wrote the second of the series, titled Mata dan Rahasia Pulau Gapi (Mata and the Secret of Gapi Island), which is based on Okky's trip to Ternate Island. In this novel Matara and her new friends are trying to help save the great legacies of Ternate Island, with Okky mixing the crucial place of the island in the world history, including it as a center of global trade and describing it as the place where British great naturalist Alfred Russel Wallace once lived and corresponded with Charles Darwin, and the imaginary world and miracles on the island. Again, the novel has been greatly welcome.
In early 2019 Okky published the third novel of the series titled Mata dan Manusia Laut (Mata and the Sea People) based on their trip to Wakatobi Island in Southeast Sulawesi. In this novel, Matara hangs out with her friends from Bajo (Bajau) community, who live on the sea in several places in Southeast Asia. This novel has also been warmly received.
The fourth and the final book of the series, called Mata di Dunia Purba (Mata in the Old World) is currently being written.

Each of the three books has become bases for various academic and thesis writing, with different aspects of the book being raised as important part for children.

Non-fiction book
In December 2019, based on her Master's thesis, Okky published her first non-fiction book titled Genealogi Sastra Indonesia: Kapitalisme, Islam dan Sastra Perlawanan (Genealogy Indonesian Literature: Capitalism, Islam and Critical Literature) in the form of digital book in her official website www.okkymadasari.net. The book, Okky's 10th published book and can be freely downloaded and printed from the website, has been enthusiastically received by the public, causing the website to temporarily crash as so many people download it at the same time in the first day of its launch. Many people appreciate Okky's willingness to provide the book freely, praising it as rare move and greatly helping ordinary people to have access to literature works previously inaccessible.

The book has received very positive review from critics, with one stating that it is a welcomed effort to seriously discuss again Indonesian literature while other claiming that the book is the first attempt since Ariel Heryanto, now a professor at Monash University in Australia, in 1985 with his book Perdebatan Sastra Konstektual (Debating Contextual Literature), which elaborates idea of Sastra Kontekstual from Arief Budiman, one of Indonesia's greatest thinkers, to really discuss Indonesian literature seriously and comprehensively.

Personal views
Okky has written a number of essays on various issues for Indonesian and international media and publication. While her novels and short stories have clearly reflected her interests and focus, her essays further confirm her position and commitment on issues like democracy, militarism, human rights, censorship, feminism, state abuse of power. elite domination, religious hypocrisy and protection of minority.

In her essay for Griffith Review titled "Islam, Capitalism and Literature" in 2015, she describes penetration of Islamic fundamentalist teachings into fiction, especially novels, without nobody seemingly aware of it, criticizing publisher's ignorance in this regard and stating that the publishing companies pay no attention to the contents as these so-called Islamic novels do sell millions of copies. She then warns the death of serious and critical literature and the wider and wider penetration of fundamentalist teachings among young Indonesians. She followed this essay by writing article on the same issue for Jakarta Post in subsequent year, titled "Questioning Islamic Label of Books and Films", criticizing the misuse of Islam in the literary, art and cultural products for mere sales and stating instead that the books and films are not Islamic at all.

Also on issue of fundamentalist penetration as wearing of hijab is becoming common across Indonesia, Okky criticizes it in her Jakarta Post's article in July 2018 as a force for uniformity, citing the fact that the authorities actually require students to wear hijab in school, and stating that those not wearing hijab are facing bullying and threats.

Okky also criticizes rising women's activism driven by strict and fundamentalist interpretation of Islam, stating that such a morally based activism is arbitrary, and is often against public interests.

Okky is also very active in fighting against blasphemy law in many of his writings, blasting it as legalizing and legitimizing hatred, violation against basic human rights and stupidity. She demands the law be changed or even eliminated altogether.

On Freedom of expression, censorship and omission in the Indonesian history, he argued the government to honest, open up and solve various past human rights abuses and killings, including 1965 massacre, and abduction of activists around 1998 movement against Suharto, especially Wiji Thukul case.,

She demanded the revision of the national curriculum to include what was actually happened during the 19965-1966, and arguing Indonesian authorities to officially acknowledge and admitted the massacre, and apologize to the victims.

On issues of the region, she believes that rather than politics and economic, a true and genuine bond of people in Southeast Asia through the Association of Southeast Nations (ASEAN) can only be achieved through cultural and literary exchanges. She also writes about Australian intellectual contribution to Indonesia, praising Australian scholars for grooming the country's critical minds.     
 
In various interviews, Okky has clearly positioned herself on many issues. More than just appealing to the masses or attracting wide readership, she believes that writing is a way of fighting for the advancement of humanity. In her novels, she also consistently tries to voice problems within the society, including discrimination, oppression and unjust treatment by the state or the ruling elites.

In several interviews and speeches, Okky stated that she reads Karl Marx and is influenced by the spirit of his human liberation ideas and Michel Foucault for his inspiration for her critical thinking, but above all she believes in individual freedom and human creativity. For her, ultimate freedom can only be achieved through freeing individual creativity.

While her views have been very clear in her novels, speeches and interviews, she actively voices the need for her generation to take side with the unprotected minority and weakest part of the society as well as joining street rallies to condemn use of violence by the state, police and mass organizations. She is fiercely against religious-based organizations that take the law into their hands, and use their power to oppress the weak minority groups in Indonesia.

Academic
Beside writing fiction, Okky is now seriously venturing into academic world with main interests and focus on the Sociology of Literature, the Sociology of Knowledge, power and knowledge production, religion as ideology and power, freedom of expression and censorship, critical view on education, history and the construction of literature.

Okky is currently a PhD candidate with the Malay Studies Department of the National University of Singapore (NUS) under a research scholarship from the university since 2019. Apart from receiving NUS Research Scholarship, she was also awarded the Dean's Fellowship, a very prestigious award of the NUS, and will only be offered to the top incoming PhD students She is now doing her PhD thesis on censorship and knowledge production in Indonesia after the fall of Suharto as she believes that rather than disappearing censorship in post Suharto has been more frequent, especially in the Joko Widodo presidency. She has been expressing how proud and honored she has been to be with the Malay Studies Department, which she says among the first, if not the first, to seriously develop social theories by using local and indigenous sources of knowledge as opposed to just be dependent on Western sources.

Okky graduated from Gadjah Mada University's International Relations Department in 2005 with bachelor's degree in Political Science. In 2012, she pursued her master's degree in sociology with the University of Indonesia, and graduated in July 2014.

In 2017, Okky was selected by the US government to represent Indonesia for the International Writing Program at the University of Iowa, US, from August to October 2017, where she engaged in various programs with local community, including speaking about Indonesia's culture to local and international audience. That year, the legendary program celebrated its half a century anniversary.

From January to June 2018, Okky was invited as resident writer and visiting fellow by the National University of Singapore.She delivered
speeches about literature and society in front of Singaporean audiences at various venues, including schools, art center, communities.

Global activism
In 2017, Okky was invited to speak at the Berlin Literature Festival in Germany on literature and about her works as well as about Indonesia in general.   A year before Okky was invited by University of Warwick in United Kingdom to speak about the role of culture and literature in forging ASEAN prosperity and unity. In 2015, she was invited by the Austrian government to speak at the Islam and Women's Contemporary Literature in Hittisau, Austria. In October that year, okky was one of Indonesian writers featured at the Frankfurt Book Fair, where Indonesia was the guest of honor. In 2014, Okky was invited to speak about literature and society at the Douarnenez Film Festival in France.

In 2017, Okky was selected by the US government to represent Indonesia for the International Writing Program at the University of Iowa, US, from August to October 2017, where she engaged in various programs with local community, including speaking about Indonesia's culture to local and international audience. That year, the legendary program celebrated its half a century anniversary.

Okky has been invited to speak at Singapore Writer Festival, Philippine Literary Festival and Kuala Lumpur Book Fair. She co-founded the ASEAN Literary Festival in 2014, and is the program director of the festival. In 2019, Okky was nominated for Southeast Asia's Women of the Future Awards for her contribution in advancement of the region's culture.

ASEAN Literary Festival

Okky in 2014 co-founded (with Indonesian journalist Abdul Khalik) the ASEAN Literary Festival with aims among others to introduce ASEAN writers and their works to the global world while providing medium for writers to exchange ideas and works so that they are familiar with each other in helping shape the so-called ASEAN community. The first ASEAN Literary Festival took place in Jakarta in March, 2014. The festival quickly becomes one of the region's most important annual cultural events.

In the  2016 festival, the Indonesian police were trying to ban the festival by withdrawing the permit it had previously issued due to protests from militant organisations against the festival's insistence to prominently feature discussions of LGBT and 1965 Communist massacre issues. But with public support and the organizers' persistence, the festival prevailed, and gained even more wide coverage and popularity subsequently.

Judging experience
Okky has become judge for a number of international and local literary competition and events, including Singapore Book Prize, Golden Point Award (an award for manuscript held by Singapore's National Arts Council) and Khatulistiwa Literary Award.

Expert witness

In her commitment to freedom of expression and fighting against censorship as well as protection of minority, Okky has become an expert witness for students of University of Sumatera Utara in a recent censorship case in Sumatera Utara Administrative Court against the university's rector who dissolved the whole editorial team of a student press, Suara USU, because of the publication of a short story.

Personal life
Okky is married to Abdul Khalik, a journalist. They met when both of them covered the United Nations Convention against Corruption (UNCAC) in Bali in January 2008 before they married in December 2008. In each of her novels, she acknowledges her husband as the first reader and her partner in discussing ideas for her novels.

Bibliography
Entrok/The Years of The Voiceless (2010)
86 (2011)
Maryam/The Outcast  (2012)
Pasung Jiwa/Bound  (2013)
Kerumunan Terakhir/The Last Crowd (2016)
Yang Bertahan dan Binasa Perlahan (2017)
Mata di Tanah Melus (2018)
Mata dan Rahasia Pulau Gapi (2018)
Mata dan Manusia Laut (2019)
Genealogi Sastra Indonesia: Kapitalisme, Islam dan Sastra Perlawanan (2019)

References

External links

Indonesian women novelists
Indonesian novelists
Indonesian women short story writers
Indonesian essayists
21st-century Indonesian women writers
Indonesian journalists
Indonesian women journalists
Gadjah Mada University alumni
University of Indonesia alumni
Indonesian sociologists
Indonesian literary critics
Women literary historians
Living people
1984 births
People from Magetan Regency